Estella Marie Thompson (born August 9, 1969), also known as Divine Brown, is an American former sex worker who gained attention from law enforcement and the media in 1995 when actor Hugh Grant was caught receiving oral sex from her in his car on Hollywood's Sunset Boulevard. Thompson has remained in the public eye since then through work in pornography, television appearances, and newspaper interviews.

Early life
Thompson grew up in poverty in the eastern part of Oakland, California. She was one of six children of a single mother. Having herself become a mother of two daughters, she turned to sex work when she could not pay a $133 electricity bill. Going to Union Square in San Francisco one night, she earned $1,000 in five hours.

Legal troubles

Arrest with Hugh Grant
On June 27, 1995, Thompson and British actor Hugh Grant were arrested together in Los Angeles. According to Thompson, the attention of a policeman was alerted by Grant repeatedly pressing the brake pedal of his BMW with his foot, causing the brake lights to flash many times.

Charged with lewd conduct, she pleaded no contest on September 6, 1995. In addition to being ordered to attend an AIDS class and perform five days of community service, she was fined $1,150 for parole violations and sentenced to 180 days in jail. Hugh Grant pleaded no contest and was fined $1,180, placed on two years' summary probation, and was ordered to complete an AIDS education program.

Other legal troubles
In September 1996, Thompson was arrested at the MGM Grand Las Vegas in Paradise after flirting and making suggestive comments to undercover police officers. A police officer involved in the operation was quoted as saying, "She didn't actually solicit, but the police officers knew what she was up to." The arrest resulted in a $950 fine for loitering for the purpose of prostitution and resisting arrest. Thompson denied she was still involved in sex work.

Media appearances
Thompson only learned who her client had been when reporters besieged her house the day after her arrest. In the publicity that ensued in the days after her encounter with Grant, Thompson appeared on television shows, including The Howard Stern Show and Danny Bonaduce's short-lived Danny!. She appeared in a television commercial promoting a Los Angeles radio station, a commercial for a Brazilian lingerie company, in semi-nude pictures for soft-porn magazines like Penthouse, and as a presenter on UK pornography channel Television X. In 1996, she played herself in an X-rated docu-drama based on the incident, Sunset and Divine: The British Experience. In September 1996, she made an appearance at the professional wrestling show Fight the Power.

Thompson continued to stay in the public eye, appearing in Joey Buttafuoco's public-access television show in 1998, on Judge Judy in 1996, and on the Danish documentary series Negermagasinet in 2005. She was the subject of the biopic Million Dollar Hooker in 2006 and appeared on Hollywood Lives, an ITV television series, in 2007.

Personal life
Thompson has been reported to have earned a total of $1.6 million from publicity related to her arrest with Grant. As a result, she and her manager, partner, and father of her children, Alvin C. Brown, bought a four-bedroom home in Beverly Hills. Thompson has said the money she earned from interviews and endorsements after the 1995 interrupted dalliance has allowed her to put her daughters through private school. "Everything worked out for the better," she said in 2007: "It helped me turn it into something positive … I was blessed that it could get me out of that lifestyle."

Grant, asked in a 2003 London Times interview about how he viewed his encounter with Thompson, said, "I think, ultimately, the pros and cons about evened out, actually. I remember saying to my agent the night of the event – I was very drunk – 'Is this bad for my career?' He was a very Hollywood guy, for whom everything is fantastic, and even he ... had to say: 'Oh, it's not great.' But on the other hand, there were odd things coming out of it that were quite positive, in a way. So I have to say, in all honesty, I think it was kind of neutral."

References

External links 
 Emily Dugan The $50 Trick (or how Divine Brown turned an encounter with Hugh Grant into her fortune) The Independent, July 3, 2007
 Divine Brown biography Rotten.com
 
 "Sunset and Divine: The British Experience (1996)" IMDb.com

1969 births
Living people
African-American television personalities
American prostitutes
People from Oakland, California
Criminals from California
21st-century African-American people
20th-century African-American people